The 1976–77 United Counties League season was the 70th in the history of the United Counties League, a football competition in England.

Premier Division

The Premier Division featured 19 clubs which competed in the division last season, along with one new club:
Buckingham Town, promoted from Division One

League table

Division One

The Division One featured 15 clubs which competed in the division last season, along with 3 new clubs:
Biggleswade Town, relegated from the Premier Division
Wootton Blue Cross reserves, promoted from Division Two 
Newport Pagnell Town, promoted from Division Two

Also, Belsize changed name to Milton Keynes Borough.

League table

Division Two

The Division Two featured 17 clubs which competed in the division last season, along with 1 new club:
Woodford United, relegated from Division One

League table

References

External links
 United Counties League

1976–77 in English football leagues
United Counties League seasons